Abu Saleh Muhammad Akram (1888, Calcutta - April 1968, Lahore) was the first Chief Justice of Dacca High Court and a former justice of the Federal Court of Pakistan (now the Supreme Court of Pakistan).

Bengal Boundary Commission
Akram was one of the two members from Pakistan at the Bengal Boundary Commission for the Radcliff Award in June 1947.

Pakistan

East Pakistan
Akram was appointed the first Chief Justice of the Dacca High Court after it was created in 1947.

Federal Court of Pakistan
In 1951, Akram became a judge of the Federal Court of Pakistan. In 1954 he was in line to succeed the retiring Chief Justice, Abdul Rashid but stood aside under pressure from Governor-General Ghulam Muhammad, and Justice Muhammad Munir was appointed instead.

In 1952, he led an inquiry against Khan Najaf Khan, a police official in connection with the assassination of Pakistan's first Prime Minister, Liaquat Ali Khan.

Council of Islamic Ideology
Akram became the first chairman of the Council of Islamic Ideology, serving from 1 August 1962 to 5 February 1964.

Death
Akram died in Lahore in April 1968.

References

1888 births
1968 deaths
19th-century Bengalis
20th-century Bengalis
Pakistani judges
Justices of the Supreme Court of Pakistan
People of East Pakistan